The India national cricket team toured New Zealand from 15 February to 12 March 1968 and played a four-match Test series against New Zealand. India won the series 3–1.

Squads

Indrajitsinhji, Sardesai and Saxena did not appear in any of the four Test matches.

Tour matches

Three-day: New Zealand Cricket Council President's XI v Indians

Three-day: Central Districts v Indians

Test Matches

1st Test

2nd Test

3rd Test

4th Test

References

External links 
 Tour home at ESPNcricinfo

1968 in Indian cricket
1968 in New Zealand cricket
1967-68
International cricket competitions from 1960–61 to 1970
New Zealand cricket seasons from 1945–46 to 1969–70